Thierb da Costa Siqueira (born 12 February 1990) is a Brazilian sprinter.

Siqueria represented Brazil at the 2011 Parapan American Games, winning two gold medals and one silver medal. Siqueria also represented Brazil at the 2012 Summer Paralympics.

References

External links
 

1990 births
Living people
Brazilian male sprinters
Brazilian male middle-distance runners
Paralympic athletes of Brazil
Athletes (track and field) at the 2012 Summer Paralympics
Medalists at the 2011 Parapan American Games
21st-century Brazilian people